Callicarpa bodinieri, or Bodinier's beautyberry, is a species of flowering plant in the genus Callicarpa of the family Lamiaceae, native to West and Central China. In midsummer, small lilac flowers are produced in the leaf axils. But it is grown in gardens primarily for its small, decorative purple berries in tight clusters in autumn.

The Latin specific epithet bodinieri refers to Émile-Marie Bodinier, a French missionary and botanist of the 19th century, who collected plants in China.

The cultivar C. bodinieri var. giraldii 'Profusion' has gained the Royal Horticultural Society's Award of Garden Merit.

References

External links
 Bodinier's Beautyberry info

bodinieri